Modern Two, formerly the Dean Gallery, in Edinburgh, is one of the two buildings housing the Scottish National Gallery of Modern Art, one of Scotland's national art galleries. It is operated by the National Galleries of Scotland. It is twinned with Modern One which lies on the opposite side of Belford Road.

Since its opening it has housed the Paolozzi Gift, a collection of works by Sir Eduardo Paolozzi, given by the artist to the Scottish National Gallery of Modern Art in 1994. The gallery also contains a large collection of Dada and Surrealist art and literature, much of which was given by Gabrielle Keiller. Modern Two also houses temporary exhibitions.

Building history
The building was a replacement for the Orphan Hospital, built 1734 on ground owned by Trinity College Kirk on Leith Wynd in the valley between the High Street and Calton Hill, the building held 100 children aged from 7 to 14 years in age and was demolished to make way for the construction of Waverley Station.

The grand style of the building has been attributed to James Bonar WS. He was an elder at Lady Glenorchy's Church which stood in the grounds of the original orphanage. When the idea of a new railway station in Edinburgh, requiring the demolition of both the orphanage and the church, arose in the early 1830s, he contrived a plan, along with his church patron, Lady Glenorchy, to combine her funds with the compensation from the railway company (ensured in an Act of 1836) to build a very generous new orphanage in the clean country air, west of the city. The Lord Provost, John Learmonth, was pulled into the idea around 1833, and he agreed to gift the land required for the project. He was however partially using this philanthropic gesture as a carrot to his fellow town councillors to allow development of the remaining land for housing (the area now known as Learmonth). Bonar appears to have also provided funds himself, either on a permanent basis, or as a bridge while awaiting the railway compensation. The result was a building costing at least double what the original expected budget was. This allowed for a truly well-built building in dressed ashlar sandstone, with two feature bellcotes.

The building, known as the Dean Orphanage, was designed by Thomas Hamilton in 1831 and took three years to build. Built in Craigleith stone from the nearby quarry, it is in English Baroque style with classical detail. The towers over the staircases contain chimneys and contribute to the Edinburgh skyline in the west of the city centre. The clock above the entrance comes from the original Orphan Hospital and in turn from the 1764 demolition of the Netherbow Port on the High Street, which formerly separated the High Street from the Canongate.

The building, which is owned by the City of Edinburgh Council, served as the Dean Education Centre for many decades before conversion to a gallery.

The plot of allotment gardens at the main entrance dates from 1940 when many school grounds were used for such purposes.

Conversion to gallery

The conversion of the building into a gallery was designed by the architect Terry Farrell and Partners.

The gallery opened in 1999 opposite the existing Scottish National Gallery of Modern Art. In 2011, the buildings were rebranded Modern Two and Modern One, respectively.

References

External links
http://www.nationalgalleries.org/

1999 establishments in Scotland
Art museums and galleries in Edinburgh
Art museums established in 1999
Category A listed buildings in Edinburgh
Culture in Edinburgh
Dada
Listed museum buildings in Scotland
Literary museums in Scotland
Modern art museums
National Galleries of Scotland
Scottish contemporary art
Surrealism